Presidential Flight is the organization responsible for air transport of the government of Abu Dhabi, United Arab Emirates. The airline previously operated under the name Abu Dhabi Amiri Flight and changed its name to Presidential Flight on 16 February 2009.

Fleet 

The Presidential Flight fleet consists of the following aircraft (as of January, 2021):

Previously, the airline operated Airbus A300-600 and A340-300 aircraft, as well as Boeing 747-400, 747-8I and 747SP, Boeing 767-300, Boeing 737-700 aircraft and Avro RJ100.

References

External links 

Presidential Flight Fleet

Airlines of the United Arab Emirates
Government-owned companies of Abu Dhabi
Air transport of heads of state
Government-owned airlines
Airlines with year of establishment missing